Edwin Soto Santiago (born May 13, 1954) is a Puerto Rican politician who served as the mayor of Las Marías since 2017, havingly held this position previously from 1997 until 2013. Soto is affiliated with the New Progressive Party (PNP).

Early years and studies

Edwin Soto Santiago was born in Barrio Maravilla of Las Marías on May 13, 1954. His parents are Germán Soto and Zoraida Santiago. 

Soto completed his elementary and high school studies in his hometown, graduating in 1971. He then enrolled at the University of Puerto Rico at Mayagüez to obtain a degree in Agronomy.

Professional career

Soto began working at San Jorge Financial, and eventually became manager. He later worked as Area Supervisor for the firm.

Political career

Soto was first elected as Mayor of Las Marías at the 1996 general election. After that, he was elected three times (2000, 2004, and 2008).

After 16 years as mayor, Soto was defeated at the 2012 general election by José Javier Rodríguez (from the Popular Democratic Party).

Personal life

Soto married Sylvia Gutiérrez Vélez on February 20, 1977. They have two children together: Karen Marie and Edwin Joel.

References

External links
Edwin Soto Santiago Biography
Edwin Soto Profile on WAPA-TV

1954 births
Living people
Mayors of places in Puerto Rico
People from Las Marías, Puerto Rico
New Progressive Party (Puerto Rico) politicians